The Gold Coast was the name for a region on the Gulf of Guinea in West Africa that was rich in gold, petroleum, sweet crude oil and natural gas. This former region is now known as the country Ghana.

Etymology and position 

The Gold Coast, Slave Coast, Pepper Coast (or Grain Coast) and Ivory Coast were named after the main export resources found there, respectively.
 
Early uses of the term Gold Coast refer strictly to the coast and not the interior. It was not until the 19th century that the term came to refer to areas that are far from the coast.
 
The Gold Coast was to the east of the Ivory Coast and to the west of the Slave Coast.

Territorial entities
Gold Coast region territorial entities were:

 Portuguese Gold Coast (Portuguese, 1482–1642)
 Dutch Gold Coast (Dutch, 1598–1872)
 Swedish Gold Coast (Swedes, 1650–1658; 1660–1663)
 Couronian Gold Coast (Duchy of Courland and Semigallia, 1651–1661)
 Danish Gold Coast (Denmark-Norway, 1658–1850)
 Brandenburger Gold Coast and Prussian Gold Coast (Germans, 1682–1721)
 British Gold Coast (English, 1821–1957)

Ghana is the legal name for the region loosely referred to as the Gold Coast comprising the following four separate parts, which immediately before independence had distinct constitutional positions:

 the Gold Coast Crown Colony; 
 the Ashanti Crown Colony;
 the Northern Territories of the Gold Coast Protectorate; and
 the Trust Territory of Togoland (under British administration).

The United Kingdom government was responsible for shepherding through the Ghana Independence Act 1957 with Charles Arden-Clarke Lord Listowel explained that the name was chosen "in accordance with the wishes of the Gold Coastian population".

History

Europeans reached this region of Africa in 1482, and for centuries afterwards, various European empires and trading companies set up trading posts, known as factories there. They used these colonies to exploit the resources rather than to settle large numbers of subjects.

The Portuguese Gold Coast was the first claim. The Dutch arrived in 1598 and in 1642 incorporated the Portuguese territory into the Dutch Gold Coast. The Dutch stayed in the region until 1871, when the last of their settlements were taken over by the British Gold Coast.

There was also the Brandenburger Gold Coast, which established a colony in the area in 1682. It later became the Prussian Gold Coast. In 1721 the Dutch purchased it. The Swedish Gold Coast settlements date to 1650. The Danes arrived in 1663 and later seized the Swedish territory and incorporated it into the Danish Gold Coast. In 1850 all of the settlements became part of the British Gold Coast.

In 1774 a London commercial expert references a witness that "the king of Guinea, the greatest city in all the countries of Negroland, has a mass of gold of thirty pounds weight as it was naturally produced in the mines which is completely pure, tough and malleable without having been smelted". The British had taken over all of Gold Coast by 1871. They captured more territory inland in the late 19th century after the Anglo-Ashanti wars.  In 1957, the territory comprising the Gold Coast Crown Colony, the Ashanti Crown Colony, the Northern Territories of the Gold Coast Protectorate and British Togoland were united as an independent dominion within the British Commonwealth of Nations under the name Ghana.

See also
 Birimian
 Convention People's Party
 Early history of Ghana
 Geology of Ghana
 Kwame Nkrumah
 United Gold Coast Convention and The Big Six

References

History of Ghana
West Africa
Historical regions